James Alexander Currie (December 15, 1916 – November 16, 1987) was an American professional basketball player. He played in the National Basketball League for the Hammond Ciesar All-Americans in 1939–40 and averaged 3.9 points per game.

References 

1916 births
1987 deaths
American men's basketball players
United States Navy personnel of World War II
Basketball players from Illinois
Forwards (basketball)
Guards (basketball)
Hammond Ciesar All-Americans players
Northwestern Wildcats men's basketball players
United States Navy officers